Emīlija Gruzīte, née Emīlija Upīte (7 September 1873, in Tirza Parish – March 1945, in Riga) was one of the first Latvian women painters at the beginning of the 20th century, attracting public attention from Artists Unit freelancers as well as journalists.

Biography 
Emīlija Upīte was born on 7 September 1873 in the Virāne manor where her father worked. She learned painting with her parish and school teachers. In Riga she became a student of Vilhelms Purvītis on the recommendation of Rūdolfs Blaumanis, and became part of the realist movement.

In 1897, Emīlija married Alfrēds Gruzīte, editor and journalist of the newspapers Dienas Lapa, Kuldīgas Vēstnesis and Kurzemnieks

She exhibited her work for the first time in a 1903 group show, and had a solo show in 1907. She continued to exhibit until the First World War. Her poem Tevi atstāju was set to music by Emīls Dārziņš.

In 2018, her work was shown at the retrospective exhibition Âmes sauvages in the Musée d'Orsay.

She died in March 1945 in Riga.

Bibliography 
 Red. Vilsons, A. Māksla un arhitektūra biogrāfijās. Riga: Latvijas enciklopēdija, 1995. 239 p.

References

External links 

1873 births
1945 deaths
20th-century Latvian women artists
Latvian painters
Painters from the Russian Empire